Mohd Alif Bin Mohd Yusof (born 19 January 1991) is a Malaysian footballer who currently plays as a defender for Malaysian club Kedah.

Career statistics

Club

Honours

Club
Kedah 
 Malaysia FA Cup: 2019

References

External links
 

1991 births
Living people
Malaysian people of Malay descent
Malaysian footballers
Felda United F.C. players
Malaysia Super League players
Association football defenders